In Japanese architecture,  are vertical rectangular panels which can slide from side to side to redefine spaces within a room, or act as doors. The heights of fusuma have increased in recent years due to an increase in average height of the Japanese population, and a  height is now common. They consist of a lattice-like wooden understructure covered in cardboard and a layer of paper or cloth on both sides. They typically have a black lacquer border and a round finger catch.

Historically, fusuma were painted, often with scenes from nature such as mountains, forests or animals. Today, many feature plain mulberry paper, or have industrially-printed graphics of fans, autumn leaves, cherry blossom, trees, or geometric graphics. Patterns for children featuring popular characters can also be purchased.

Both fusuma and shōji are room dividers that run on wooden rails at the top and bottom. Traditionally these were waxed, but nowadays they usually have a vinyl lubricating strip to ease movement of the fusuma and shōji. Fusuma are typically made of opaque cloth or paper, while shōji are made of sheer, translucent paper.

Fusuma and shōji, along with tatami straw mats (for the floor) make up a typical Japanese room.

See also
 List of partitions of traditional Japanese architecture
 Shōji

References

External links

English site explaining all about fusuma, with diagrams and photos
Momoyama, Japanese Art in the Age of Grandeur, an exhibition catalog from The Metropolitan Museum of Art (fully available online as PDF), which contains material on fusuma 

Japanese architectural features
Japanese architectural styles
Japanese home
Types of wall
Doors
Partitions in traditional Japanese architecture